Autumn Trip is a 1991 South Korean film by Kwak Jae-yong. It revolves around the journeys of five people who venture on different paths to discover their wounds.

Cast
 Lee Mi-yeon
 Lee Geung-young
 Kim Min-jong
Gang Mun-hui
Choi Hak-rak
Lee Ki-yeol
Chu Seok-yang
Kim Hyeon-jeong
Byeon Hye-jin
Han Jeong-ho

External links
 

South Korean drama road movies
Films directed by Kwak Jae-yong
1991 films
1990s Korean-language films
1990s drama road movies